Priyadarshini-class patrol vessels (also referred to as Jija Bai Mod 1 class) are a series of 8 mid-shore fast patrol boats,  built by  Garden Reach Shipbuilders & Engineers, Kolkata and Goa Shipyard Limited, Vasco da Gama, Goa for Indian Coast Guard between 1991 and 1998.

Design
The 46 metre-long vessels with a displacement of 215 tonnes have a top speed of 24 knots. The vessels are powered by two MTU 12V538 diesel engines driving two independent four-blade propellers. The Priyadarshini class has a range of 2400 nm at cruise speed of 12 knots. The crew of the patrol vessels consists of 5 officers and 29 enlisted sailors. The vessels are armed with a 40 mm 60 cal Bofors Mk 3 AA. In early 1998, ICGS Amrit Kaur (225) acted as a trial platform for the 30 mm CRN 91 Naval Gun.

Last ship Rajiya Sulatana was decommissioned on 1 June 2021.

Ships of the class

Specification
Displacement: 215 tonnes
Length: 46 meter
Beam: 7.5 meter
Draught: 1.85 meter
Speed: 24 Knots
Armament: 40 mm 60 cal Bofors Mk 3 AA or 1x30 CRN 91; 2x7.62 mm MG
Radar: BEL make-1*Decca 1245/6X or Decca 1226 for navigation
Power: 2 MTU 12V538 TB82 diesel
Propulsion: 2*4 Blade propeller, 5940 bhp
Electric: 240 kW (3*80 kW, 315 V,50 Hz Diesel driven)
Range: 2400 nm at 12 knots
Crew: 5 officers. 29 enlisted.
Fuel: 20 Tonnes

See also
Jija Bai class patrol vessel

References

External links
http://www.grse.nic.in
http://grosstonnage.com
https://web.archive.org/web/20101029043426/http://www.goashipyard.co.in/products_history.aspx

Fast attack craft of the Indian Coast Guard
Patrol boat classes
Ships of the Indian Coast Guard